Deputy White House counsel Vince Foster was found dead in Fort Marcy Park off the George Washington Parkway in Virginia, outside Washington, D.C., on July 20, 1993. His death was ruled a suicide by five official investigations.

Suicide and investigation
Park Police discovered Foster dead from an apparently self-inflicted gun shot wound to the head in Fort Marcy Park off the George Washington Parkway in Virginia on July 20, 1993. Foster was holding a gun in his hand. An autopsy and subsequent investigation later confirmed that Foster had died by shooting himself once in the mouth with the .38 caliber Colt revolver found at the scene.

Subsequent investigations found that Foster was distraught over accusations and criticisms related to the White House travel office controversy. Foster had confided to friends and colleagues that he was considering resignation, but feared that he could not handle the "personal humiliation" of returning to Arkansas in defeat. Foster admitted to his sister that he was depressed shortly before his death, and he sought treatment for depression one day before committing suicide.

Although police found no evidence of foul play, several tabloids and newsletters speculated that Foster's death may have been a homicide, possibly involving the Clintons themselves. Subsequent investigations by special prosecutor Robert Fiske and the Senate Banking Committee concluded that there was no evidence of a homicide. A final investigation, led by special prosecutor Kenneth Starr, also concluded that there was no evidence to support the claim that Foster was murdered. Starr's report addressed several additional questions about physical and forensic evidence that had previously fueled speculation about the case. The report established that Foster owned the handgun used in the suicide, and confirmed that the body had not been moved from its position prior to its discovery by police. The report concluded "In sum, based on all of the available evidence, which is considerable, the OIC [Office of Independent Counsel] agrees with the conclusion reached by every official entity that has examined the issue: Mr. Foster committed suicide by gunshot in Fort Marcy Park on July 20, 1993."

The suicide has nevertheless continued to fuel speculation: then-presidential candidate Donald Trump made news in 2016 when he remarked in an interview with the Washington Post that Foster's death was "very fishy", and added "I will say there are people who continue to bring it up because they think it was absolutely a murder. I don't do that because I don't think it's fair."

Evidence

Torn note

A draft of a resignation letter was found torn into 27 pieces in a briefcase after his death. Associate White House counsel, Steve Neuwirth, discovered the torn pieces of the note in Foster's briefcase on July 26. After receiving the note from Neuwirth, White House Counsel Bernard Nussbaum handled the note various times before giving it to Park Police Lieutenant Joseph Megby the following evening.

The United States Department of Justice revealed the note's contents at a joint press conference with the Park Police on August 10. The DoJ stated that a smudged palm print was on the note, but no fingerprints; they confirmed the handwriting as Foster's.   

Independent Counsel Robert Ray's report regarding the Whitewater controversy stated the FBI Laboratory performed a 1995 fingerprint examination of the note and identified Nussbaum's palm print on it. Three handwriting experts stated that the note was a forgery, with Oxford University manuscript expert Reginald Alton stating that the forgery was done by a "moderate forger, not necessarily a pro, somebody who could forge a check." However, the final report stated that three separate handwriting analyses of the note by the Capitol Police and the FBI determined that the handwriting on the note was Foster's.

Conspiracy theories

The Arkansas Project
On May 2, 1999, The Washington Post published new details on the pursuit of a Foster conspiracy in an article by David Brock, a key figure in the Troopergate and Whitewater scandals whose disillusionment with the political corruption motivating what would come to be known as the Arkansas Project ended his lifelong commitment to the Conservative movement and facilitated public dissemination of insider details on G.O.P. machinations. The article explains how Brock was "summoned" to a meeting with Rex Armistead in Miami, Florida at an airport hotel. Brock claims that Armistead laid out for him an elaborate "Vince Foster murder scenario" – a scenario that he found implausible.

The Clinton Chronicles: A Political Firestorm
In 1997 crime reporter Dan Moldea was approached by Regnery Publishing House, a conservative group whose leadership was impressed by Moldea's published works, to publish a book on the Foster case.

In researching Foster's death, Moldea found that documents relating to the Whitewater corporation were removed from Foster's office on July 22 and sent to the Clintons’ personal attorney, and that the most oft-used conspiracy scenario could be traced back to Park Police Major Robert Hines, who shared the idea with Reed Irvine (Accuracy in Media) and Christopher Ruddy (New York Post). Moldea concludes, and Maj. Hines publicly maintains, that Hines incorrectly told Irvine and Ruddy "... that there is no exit wound in Foster's head ... I don't think there was anything nefarious here; he was being approached by reporters and he wanted something to say." Still, the "missing exit wound" claim continued to surface.

Moldea's research sought, among other things, to discover the origins of this line of investigation into the Clintons' credibility. In an interview for Salon.com, he suggests that "Foster had some blond hair and carpet fibers on his suit jacket, and he had semen in his underwear. So, the Jerry Falwells and the right-wing crowd get a hold of this information, and…they start making movies alleging that the Clintons were involved in this murder."

In 1994, Falwell subsidized the creation of a film called The Clinton Chronicles that featured Ruddy's claims that the gun that killed Foster was placed in his hand after the fact, and that Foster's body was laid out to give the appearance of suicide, among others. Funding for the film was provided by Citizens for Honest Government, an organization to which Falwell gave $200,000 in 1994 and 1995.

Citizens for Honest Government covertly paid individuals who had provided information to media outlets such as the Wall Street Journal editorial page and the American Spectator magazine;" and in 1995, made discretionary payments to two Arkansas state troopers who had spoken out in support of the idea of a conspiracy surrounding Foster's death. The two troopers, Roger Perry and Larry Patterson, had also previously given testimony supporting Paula Jones's claims of sexual misconduct and misuse of government resources against Bill Clinton (see Troopergate).

See also
 Furtive fallacy
 Murder of Seth Rich

References

Notes

Books
 Hugh Sprunt, Citizen's Independent Report: Material Errors, Omissions, Inconsistencies, & Curiosa
 John Clarke, Patrick Knowlton and Hugh Turley. "Failure of the Public Trust", McCabe Publishing, 1999;  
David Brock, Blinded by the Right : The Conscience of an Ex-Conservative, Three Rivers Press, 2003.
 Clinton, Bill (2005). My Life: Bill Clinton, Vintage Publishing; 
Joe Conason and Gene Lyons, The Hunting of the President: The Ten-Year Campaign to Destroy Bill and Hillary Clinton. St. Martin's Press, 2001; 
Dan Moldea. A Washington Tragedy: How the Death of Vincent Foster Ignited a Political Firestorm, Regnery Publishing, 1998 
Ambrose Evans-Pritchard, The Secret Life of Bill Clinton, Regnery Publishing, 1999; 
 Christopher Ruddy. The Strange Death of Vincent Foster: An Investigation, Free Press, 2002;

External links
 Report on the Death of Vincent W. Foster, Jr,/by the Office of Independent Counsel in Re Madison Guaranty Savings and Loan Association HATHI Trust Digital Library, Universities of Michigan and Purdue, the complete 137 page, 2 vol. report with app., footnotes, and exhibits
 Once Upon a Time in Arkansas: Vince Foster's journal from Frontline
 Foster Report posted by The Washington Post (NOTE: This file does not contain the report's footnotes or appendix)
 

1993 in American politics
Suicides by firearm in Virginia
1993 in Virginia
Foster, Vince
Deaths by person in Virginia
July 1993 events in the United States
Conspiracy theories promoted by Donald Trump
Conspiracy theories in the United States